St. Mary's Church of Lappee is a wooden Evangelical Lutheran church in the center of Lappeenranta, Finland. The construction began in April 1792 and the church was consecrated partially unfinished in June 1794. The adjacent bell tower was built half a century later in 1856.

The church was built by Juhana Salonen, a church builder from Savitaipale, and has a capacity of 840 people. Architecturally it is a so-called double cross church and the only surviving such church from the 18th century in Finland. The altarpiece was painted by Alexandra Frosterus-Såltin in 1887 and depicts the Ascension of Jesus.

The church is listed as a nationally significant built heritage site by the Finnish National Board of Antiquities.

See also
 Lauritsala Church
 Nuijamaa Church

References

External links
 Official site (in Finnish)

Lappeenranta
Wooden churches in Finland
Churches completed in 1794
Lutheran churches in Finland